The Golden Arena for Best Supporting Actor is an annual award, given by the Pula-based cinema circle at the Pula Film Festival, to honour the actors who gave outstanding performances in a supporting role. The Golden Arena is considered the Balkan equivalent of the Academy Award.

As Yugoslav Film Awards

As Croatian Film Awards

Performers with multiple awards - supporting roles

Performers with multiple awards - both supporting and lead roles

 Years in bold insight Best Actor winner

References

External links

Pula Film Festival
Awards established in 1955
1955 establishments in Yugoslavia